BP-5 Compact Food (also known as a BP-5 biscuit) is a high-calorie, vitamin fortified, compact, compressed and dry emergency food (food ration bar), often used by relief agencies for the emergency feeding of refugees and internally displaced persons.

Description
BP-5 is available in packs of 2 biscuit bars. Each box of 9 packs contains 500g of food, with approximately 2,300 calories per box.  Shelf life is 5 years.  The food is produced by Compact AS, based in Norway, and purchased by agencies through UNICEF.

Ingredients
Ingredients include baked wheat flour, partially hydrogenated soybean oil, sugar, soy protein concentrate, malt extract, minerals, amino acids, and vitamins.

Usage
BP-5 is used for disaster relief and disaster preparedness, and for emergency food rations in refugee camps, particularly for malnourished children.  It is eaten directly, or mixed with water to make a porridge.

Typically, an adult is given 250g per day. Although this is a calorie deficit, it provides the recommended protein and basic vitamin requirements.  Because it is easily digestible, neutral tasting, and contains no dairy or meat products the food may be widely used, even for people with severe malnourishment.

One study found that its portability made it susceptible to cheating, and recommended dispensing pre-prepared food instead when practical.

BP-5, along with Plumpy Nut (a peanut-butter supplement) was fed to visitors to a small mobile refugee camp created by Médecins Sans Frontières (Doctors Without Borders) to travel to major world cities to raise awareness.

See also
 Humanitarian daily ration

References

Dietary supplements
Malnutrition